The athletics competition at the 2005 Mediterranean Games was held in the Mediterraneo Stadium in Almería, Spain from 29 June to 2 July 2005. France topped the medal tally with 10 golds and 30 medals overall, with host nation Italy coming in second with 9 golds and 26 medals overall.

A total of 47 events were contested, with 24 contested by male athletes and 23 contested by female athletes. The 3000 metres steeplechase and 1500 metres wheelchair (males only), and the 800 metres wheelchair (females only) were the only events that were not held for both genders. The 2005 Games also marked the replacement of the marathon event with the half marathon.

Medal summary

Men's events

Women's events

Medal table

Participating nations

 (1)
 (17)
 (3)
 (18)
 (9)
 (6)
 (66)
 (37)
 (64)
 (2)
 (3)
 (5)
 (2)
 (34)
 (10)
 (19)
 (102)
 (2)
 (20)
 (12)

References
gbrathletics
Results

Mediterranean Games
Athletics
2005
Mediterranean 2005